Fire Emblem Warriors is a hack and slash action role-playing game developed by Omega Force and Team Ninja, and published by Koei Tecmo in Japan and Nintendo internationally for the Nintendo Switch and New Nintendo 3DS. The game was released in Japan in September 2017, and worldwide the following month. The game is a collaboration between Koei Tecmo's Warriors franchise and Nintendo and Intelligent Systems's Fire Emblem series.

The game received generally positive reviews, with critics praising the combination of Fire Emblem and Dynasty Warriors gameplay and drawing favorable comparisons to Hyrule Warriors, originally released in 2014 for the Wii U.

A successor, Fire Emblem Warriors: Three Hopes, was released for Nintendo Switch on June 24, 2022.

Gameplay 
Fire Emblem Warriors is a hack-and-slash action role-playing game similar to the Dynasty Warriors series in which players take the role of Rowan and Lianna, and characters from several Fire Emblem games. Games represented in Warriors include Fire Emblem: Shadow Dragon and the Blade of Light, Fire Emblem Gaiden, Fire Emblem: The Blazing Blade, Fire Emblem Awakening, and Fire Emblem Fates. The player defeats enemies with any character, accomplishing specific goals to beat maps. In addition to hack-and-slash combat, the game includes the ability to give tactical commands to units and the Weapon Triangle, which originated from the Fire Emblem series.

Weapons in the game include axes, lances, swords, bows, tomes, and dragonstones. When characters assist, heal, or fight alongside each other in battle, their bond strengthens. Like in Fire Emblem games, if two characters' bond increases enough, a support conversation will be unlocked. The game will also utilize all existing and future Fire Emblem Amiibo figurines, which give weapons related to the character represented by the Amiibo that is used.

Plot 
While the royal twins of Aytolis, Rowan and Lianna spar with their friend Prince Darios of Gristonne, the kingdom is suddenly attacked by monsters. The three are separated from the twins' mother, Aytolis's Queen Yelena during the attack, who gives them the Shield of Flames before being captured. The group learns that Darios' father Oskar is seeking to revive the evil Chaos Dragon Velezark, and that they must power up the Shield of Flames with Gleamstones created from the power of heroes from other worlds to prevent Velezark's resurrection.

Rowan and Lianna travel across Aytolis, rallying support from heroes from the otherworldy nations of Ylisse, Hoshido, Nohr, and Altea. During an attack on a Gristonne fortress, Velezark successfully possesses Darios, who steals the Shield of Flames just after it is complete. Rowan and Lianna pursue him to Gristonne, where they discover Yelena has been captured to be used as a sacrifice to revive Velezark. Rowan and Lianna successfully rescue their mother, leading to Darios sacrificing Oskar to complete the ritual to revive Velezark. Now freed from the possession, Darios returns the Shield of Flames to the group before falling to his death. Rowan, Lianna, and the other heroes then battle Velezark and finally slay him. With Velezark slain, the other heroes return to their home worlds and Queen Yelena crowns the twins as rulers of Aytolis.

Development and release 

Fire Emblem Warriors was developed by the same team as Hyrule Warriors, a collaboration between the Dynasty Warriors series and The Legend of Zelda. The game was co-developed by Koei Tecmo studios Omega Force and Team Ninja and Fire Emblem developers Intelligent Systems. Koei Tecmo first proposed the project to Nintendo, who were more than willing to collaborate, making the game a title for their in-development Nintendo Switch home console. The idea of the game came during the development of Hyrule Warriors Legends, as the touchscreen controls bore similarities to those of the Fire Emblem series.

The game was announced in January 2017 as part of a Nintendo Direct broadcast dedicated to the Fire Emblem series, although it had already been in development for around two years before this time. It was released in Japan on September 28, 2017, and released in North America, Europe, and Australia on October 20, 2017.

Downloadable content 
Three packs of paid additional content were announced before the game's release. Each pack added three new playable characters, new support conversations, and three new maps for History mode, in addition to new weapons, costumes, and other content. Each of the DLC on a different Fire Emblem game: Fire Emblem Fates, Fire Emblem: Shadow Dragon, and Fire Emblem Awakening respectively. If all three packs were bought together in the season pass, an additional costume was unlocked.

Reception 

Fire Emblem Warriors received mixed reviews according to review aggregator Metacritic, with the Nintendo Switch version holding a score of 74/100 based on 72 critic reviews and the New Nintendo 3DS version receiving a score of 69/100 based on 12 reviews. The game received praise for bringing a more nuanced, textured experience to the musou genre, but drew criticism for its shallow take on traditional Fire Emblem mechanics and roster choice.

The Nintendo Switch version sold 41,491 copies within its first week on sale on Japan, while the New Nintendo 3DS version sold 18,357 copies. In April 2018, Koei Tecmo revealed that the game sold 1 million copies worldwide.

Notes

References

External links 

2017 video games
Action video games
Warriors
Hack and slash games
Multiplayer and single-player video games
New Nintendo 3DS games
Nintendo Switch games
Omega Force games
Video game spin-offs
Video games developed in Japan
Video games featuring female protagonists
Video games that use Amiibo figurines
Warriors (video game series)